Events in the year 1920 in Portugal.

Incumbents
President: António José de Almeida
Prime Minister: Frequent changes – Cardosu, Pereira, Baptista, Preto, da Silva, Granjo, de Castro, Pinto.

Events
Establishment of the Reconstitution Party.

Arts and entertainment

Sports
Portugal competes in Fencing and Shooting at the Summer Olympics
Casa Pia A.C. founded
Estrela de Vendas Novas founded
Imortal DC founded
SC Vila Real founded

Births
7 February – Miguel Lourenço, footballer.

Deaths

6 June – António Maria Baptista, military officer and politician (born 1866)

References

 
1920s in Portugal
Years of the 20th century in Portugal
Portugal